JVG could be:
 Jeff Van Gundy, American basketball coach, abbreviated as JVG
 JVG (band), Finnish rap duo formerly known as Jare & VilleGalle
 JVG Racing, a racing team in FIA GT Championship for 2001 to 2004